Qalaychi (also Romanized as Qalāychī; also known as Kalāchī, Kalahchi, and Kalakhchi) is a village in Zanjanrud-e Pain Rural District, Zanjanrud District, Zanjan County, Zanjan Province, Iran. At the 2006 census, its population was 89, in 19 families.

References 

Populated places in Zanjan County